América Latina Olé was a concert tour by The Rolling Stones, which began on 3 February 2016 in Santiago and made stops in La Plata, Montevideo, Rio de Janeiro, São Paulo, Porto Alegre, Lima, Bogotá, Mexico City and ended in Havana with a free show on 25 March 2016. The tour was chronicled on two video releases: The Rolling Stones: Havana Moon, which documented the final show, and Olé Olé Olé!: A Trip Across Latin America, a documentary following the band across the continent.

History 
On 17 September 2015, the Spanish newspaper El Mundo revealed that the Rolling Stones were (at the time) in final negotiations to perform for the very first time in Cuba, at the end of March 2016 (on 20 or 21 March). The location would be Havana and the venue the Estadio Latinoamericano (Latin American Stadium), a facility with capacity for 55,000 people. Keith Richards confirmed the negotiations with the Cubans, adding that Cuba had taken it seriously, following the opening of embassies in the United States and the Pope's (then) upcoming visit to Havana. It was also reported that the Stones' bassist Darryl Jones had influenced the decision to play in Cuba.

On 5 November 2015, it was announced that the Rolling Stones would be going on tour in Latin America in 2016 for the first time since their A Bigger Bang Tour in February 2006, the name of this 13-date stadium tour being "América Latina Olé Tour 2016". The tour would include their second ever show in Chile (the first being during the Voodoo Lounge Tour in February 1995) and their first show in São Paulo since the Bridges to Babylon Tour in April 1998. The Stones were also due to play their first ever shows in Uruguay, Peru, Colombia and Cuba.

Later in November 2015, another show was rumoured to occur also on 20 or 21 March 2016 at the Estadio Olimpico Felix Sanchez in Santo Domingo, Dominican Republic but this show was never confirmed. On 1 March 2016, The Stones confirmed their first ever show in Cuba due to occur on 25 March 2016, to be a free concert, their first ever in the Caribbean and the first open air concert in the country by a British rock band. The band played at, but not inside, the Coliseo de la Ciudad Deportiva de La Habana. Dubbed the "Concert for Amity," it broke the previous record of the Italian singer Zucchero Fornaciari who performed to a crowd of nearly 70,000 goers in 2012.

Personnel

The Rolling Stones
Mick Jagger – lead vocals, guitars, harmonica, percussion
Keith Richards – rhythm guitars, backing vocals
Charlie Watts – drums
Ronnie Wood – lead guitars

Additional musicians
Sasha Allen – backing vocals, duet with Jagger on "Gimme Shelter"
Matt Clifford – keyboards, percussion, French horn
Karl Denson – saxophone
Bernard Fowler – backing vocals, percussion
Darryl Jones – bass guitar
Chuck Leavell – keyboards, backing vocals
Tim Ries – saxophone, keyboards

Tour dates

Set list 

Estadio Nacional

 "Start Me Up"
 "It's Only Rock 'n Roll (But I Like It)"
 "Let's Spend the Night Together"
 "Tumbling Dice"
 "Out of Control"
 "She's a Rainbow"
 "Wild Horses"
 "Paint It Black"
 "Honky Tonk Women"
 "You Got the Silver"
 "Happy"
 "Midnight Rambler"
 "Miss You"
 "Gimme Shelter"
 "Jumpin' Jack Flash"
 "Sympathy for the Devil"
 "Brown Sugar"
Encore
 "You Can't Always Get What You Want"
 "(I Can't Get No) Satisfaction"

Estadio Ciudad de la Plata 1

 "Start Me Up"
 "It's Only Rock'n Roll (But I Like It)"
 "Tumbling Dice"
 "Out of Control"
 "Street Fighting Man"
 "Anybody Seen My Baby?"
 "Wild Horses"
 "Paint It Black"
 "Honky Tonk Women"
 "Can't Be Seen"
 "Happy"
 "Midnight Rambler"
 "Miss You"
 "Gimme Shelter"
 "Brown Sugar"
 "Sympathy for the Devil"
 "Jumpin' Jack Flash"
Encore
 "You Can't Always Get What You Want"
 "(I Can't Get No) Satisfaction"

Estadio Ciudad de la Plata 2

 "Jumpin' Jack Flash"
 "Let's Spend the Night Together"
 "It's Only Rock'n Roll (But I Like It)"
 "Tumbling Dice"
 "Out of Control"
 "Angie"
 "Paint It Black"
 "Can't You Hear Me Knocking"
 "Honky Tonk Women"
 "Slipping Away"
 "Before They Make Me Run"
 "Midnight Rambler"
 "Miss You"
 "Gimme Shelter"
 "Start Me Up"
 "Sympathy for the Devil"
 "Brown Sugar"
Encore
 "You Can't Always Get What You Want"
 "(I Can't Get No) Satisfaction"

Estadio Ciudad de la Plata 3

 "Start Me Up"
 "It's Only Rock'n Roll (But I Like It)"
 "Tumbling Dice"
 "Out of Control"
 "Beast of Burden"
 "You Got Me Rocking"
 "Paint It Black"
 "Honky Tonk Women"
 "You Got the Silver"
 "Happy"
 "Midnight Rambler"
 "Miss You"
 "Gimme Shelter"
 "Brown Sugar"
 "Sympathy for the Devil"
 "Jumpin' Jack Flash"
Encore
 "You Can't Always Get What You Want"
 "(I Can't Get No) Satisfaction"

Estadio Centenario'

 "Start Me Up"
 "It's Only Rock 'n Roll (But I Like It)"
 "Tumbling Dice"
 "Out of Control"
 "She's So Cold"
 "Wild Horses"
 "Paint It Black"
 "Honky Tonk Women"
 "Slipping Away"
 "Can't Be Seen"
 "Midnight Rambler"
 "Miss You"
 "Gimme Shelter"
 "Brown Sugar"
 "Sympathy for the Devil"
 "Jumpin' Jack Flash"
Encore
 "You Can't Always Get What You Want"
 "(I Can't Get No) Satisfaction"

Estádio do Maracanã

 "Start Me Up"
 "It's Only Rock 'n Roll (But I Like It)"
 "Tumbling Dice"
 "Out of Control"
 "Like a Rolling Stone"
 "Doom and Gloom"
 "Angie"
 "Paint It Black"
 "Honky Tonk Women"
 "You Got the Silver"
 "Before They Make Me Run" 
 "Midnight Rambler"
 "Miss You"
 "Gimme Shelter"
 "Brown Sugar"
 "Sympathy for the Devil"
 "Jumpin' Jack Flash"
Encore
 "You Can't Always Get What You Want"
 "(I Can't Get No) Satisfaction"

Estádio do Morumbi 1

 "Start Me Up"
 "It's Only Rock 'n Roll (But I Like It)"
 "Tumbling Dice"
 "Out of Control"
 "Bitch"
 "Beast of Burden"
 "Worried About You"
 "Paint It Black"
 "Honky Tonk Women"
 "You Got the Silver"
 "Happy"
 "Midnight Rambler"
 "Miss You"
 "Gimme Shelter"
 "Brown Sugar"
 "Sympathy for the Devil"
 "Jumpin' Jack Flash"
Encore
 "You Can't Always Get What You Want"
 "(I Can't Get No) Satisfaction"

Estádio do Morumbi 2

 "Jumpin' Jack Flash"
 "It's Only Rock 'n Roll (But I Like It)"
 "Tumbling Dice"
 "Out of Control"
 "All Down the Line"
 "She's a Rainbow"
 "Wild Horses"
 "Paint It Black"
 "Honky Tonk Women"
 "Slipping Away"
 "Before They Make Me Run" 
 "Midnight Rambler"
 "Miss You"
 "Gimme Shelter"
 "Start Me Up"
 "Sympathy for the Devil"
 "Brown Sugar"
Encore
 "You Can't Always Get What You Want"
 "(I Can't Get No) Satisfaction"

Estádio Beira Rio
"Jumpin' Jack Flash"
 "It's Only Rock 'n Roll (But I Like It)"
 "Tumbling Dice"
 "Out of Control"
 "Let's Spend the Night Together"
 "Ruby Tuesday"
 "Paint It Black"
 "Honky Tonk Women"
 "You Got the Silver"
 "Before They Make Me Run" 
 "Midnight Rambler"
 "Miss You"
 "Gimme Shelter"
 "Start Me Up"
 "Sympathy for the Devil"
 "Brown Sugar"
Encore
 "You Can't Always Get What You Want"
 "(I Can't Get No) Satisfaction"

Estadio Monumental

 "Start Me Up"
 "It's Only Rock 'n Roll (But I Like It)"
 "Tumbling Dice"
 "Out of Control"
 "Like a Rolling Stone"
 "Angie"
 "Paint It Black"
 "Honky Tonk Women"
 "You Got the Silver"
 "Before They Make Me Run" 
 "Midnight Rambler"
 "Miss You"
 "Gimme Shelter"
 "Jumpin' Jack Flash"
 "Sympathy for the Devil"
 "Brown Sugar"
Encore
 "You Can't Always Get What You Want"
 "(I Can't Get No) Satisfaction"

Estadio El Campín

 "Jumpin' Jack Flash"
 "It's Only Rock 'n Roll (But I Like It)"
 "Tumbling Dice"
 "Dead Flowers"
 "Beast of Burden" (with Juanes)
 "Wild Horses"
 "Paint It Black"
 "Honky Tonk Women"
 "You Got the Silver"
 "Before They Make Me Run" 
 "Midnight Rambler"
 "Miss You"
 "Gimme Shelter"
 "Start Me Up"
 "Sympathy for the Devil"
 "Brown Sugar"
Encore
 "You Can't Always Get What You Want"
 "(I Can't Get No) Satisfaction"

Foro Sol 1

 "Start Me Up"
 "It's Only Rock 'n Roll (But I Like It)"
 "Tumbling Dice"
 "Out of Control"
 "Street Fighting Man"
 "Wild Horses"
 "Paint It Black"
 "Honky Tonk Women"
 "You Got the Silver"
 "Before They Make Me Run" 
 "Midnight Rambler"
 "Miss You"
 "Gimme Shelter"
 "Jumpin' Jack Flash"
 "Sympathy for the Devil"
 "Brown Sugar"
Encore
 "You Can't Always Get What You Want"
 "(I Can't Get No) Satisfaction"

Foro Sol 2

 "Jumpin' Jack Flash"
 "It's Only Rock 'n Roll (But I Like It)"
 "Tumbling Dice"
 "Out of Control"
 "Let's Spend the Night Together"
 "Angie"
 "Paint It Black"
 "Honky Tonk Women"
 "You Got the Silver"
 "Happy"
 "Midnight Rambler"
 "Miss You"
 "Gimme Shelter"
 "Start Me Up"
 "Sympathy for the Devil"
 "Brown Sugar"
Encore
 "You Can't Always Get What You Want"
 "(I Can't Get No) Satisfaction"

Ciudad Deportiva de La Habana

 "Jumpin' Jack Flash"
 "It's Only Rock 'n Roll (But I Like It)"
 "Tumbling Dice"
 "Out of Control"
 "All Down the Line"
 "Angie"
 "Paint It Black"
 "Honky Tonk Women"
 "You Got the Silver"
 "Before They Make Me Run" 
 "Midnight Rambler"
 "Miss You"
 "Gimme Shelter"
 "Start Me Up"
 "Sympathy for the Devil"
 "Brown Sugar"
Encore
 "You Can't Always Get What You Want"
 "(I Can't Get No) Satisfaction"

See also 
The Rolling Stones concerts

References

External links 
The Rolling Stones (Official site)

2016 concert tours
2016 in Argentina
2016 in Brazil
2016 in Chile
2016 in Colombia
2016 in Cuba
2016 in Mexico
2016 in Peru
2016 in Uruguay
Concert tours of Mexico
Concert tours of South America
February 2016 events in South America
March 2016 events in North America
March 2016 events in South America
The Rolling Stones concert tours
March 2016 events in Mexico